Earl Percy Reid (June 8, 1913 – May 11, 1984) was a professional baseball player.  He was a right-handed pitcher for one season (1946) with the Boston Braves.  For his career, he compiled a 1-0 record, with a 3.00 earned run average, and two strikeouts in three innings pitched.

Reid was born in Bangor, Alabama and later died in Cullman, Alabama at the age of 70.

External links

 

1913 births
1984 deaths
Boston Braves players
Major League Baseball pitchers
Baseball players from Alabama
Enterprise Browns players
Augusta Tigers players
Binghamton Triplets players
Portland Beavers players
Indianapolis Indians players
Milwaukee Brewers (minor league) players
Toledo Mud Hens players
San Antonio Missions players
Dallas Eagles players
Gainesville Owls players
Temple Eagles players
People from Blount County, Alabama